C. A. Rosetti may refer to:
 Constantin Alexandru Rosetti, a Romanian revolutionary
 C. A. Rosetti, a commune in Buzău County, Romania
 C. A. Rosetti, a commune in Tulcea County, Romania

See also
 Rosetti (disambiguation)